Maksym Heorhiyovych Holenko (born April 6, 1978, in Mykolaiv, Ukraine) is a Ukrainian director of theater and cinema, chief director of the independent "Wild Theater," and chief director of the Odessa Academic Ukrainian Music and Drama Theater named after Vasyl Vasylko (since September 29, 2020).

Productions 

 The Beauty Queen, 2015 
 Aphrodisiac 2016 
 "Woman, Sit Down" 2018 
 Catching Kaidash. 2019 
 Penita.opera, 2019 
 To Catch the Kaidash 2020
 Chaos. Women on the verge of a nervous breakdown, 2022

References 

1978 births
Ukrainian film directors
Ukrainian theatre directors
People from Mykolaiv
Living people
Theatre people from Odesa